The red pill is a symbol from the 1999 film The Matrix.

Red pill may also refer to:

 A core belief of the manosphere
 The Red Pill, a 2016 documentary film
 /r/TheRedPill, a manosphere-related subreddit
 "Redpill", a software patch in early versions of Windows 8
 Red Pill, a novel by Hari Kunzru

See also
 Blue pill (disambiguation)
 Black pill (disambiguation)
 Black Pill Red Pill, a record label
 
 Red Pill Black, a website produced by Candace Owens
 Red Pill Blues, an album by the band Maroon 5